Fred Loya Insurance is a Texas based Hispanic 500 car insurance company. As of 2016 the company had 5,200 employees and 700 offices in Alabama, Arizona, California, Colorado, Georgia, Illinois, Indiana, New Mexico, Nevada, Ohio and Texas. It is the 18th largest Latino-owned company in the country.

The company is headquartered in El Paso, Texas and owned by Fred Loya, a Latin American. Loya began selling insurance in 1974. In 2008 Loya consolidated three San Antonio claims centers into one.

History and current company structure

Fred Loya started Loya Insurance Group in 1974 in El Paso, Texas.  It began as a single store front office and has since expanded to more than 361 agencies across six states California, Colorado, Illinois, New Mexico, Nevada and Texas.
  
The Loya Insurance Group agencies are located in multiple types of locations such as shopping centers, grocery stores, street corners, and office buildings.  The agencies are in both small and large towns and cities and focus on being in places where the lower income people go on a regular basis.

Small Business Stimulus Campaign 
Fred Loya Insurance has launched a small business incentive program in which it will choose to grant $5,000 per week for a small business in the El Paso area.

Locations 
Some places that the agencies are located include:

 Wal-Mart Supercenters
 Fiesta Marts
 Big 8 Food Source stores
 Liborio Supermarkets
 Fiesta Whole Food
 Superior
 Cardenas

Leadership 

 Fred Loya Sr. - Chairman Emeritus
 Fred Loya Jr. - Chief Executive Officer
 Flower Loya - President
 Ben Salazar - Chief Operating Officer
 Joe Ramirez - Chief Financial Officer
 Edgar Fiol - Executive Sales Director
 Edgar Meza - Vice President of Claims Department
 Ricardo Chavez - Managing Attorney
 George Briones - Director of Information and Technology
 Lana Ruiz - Senior Underwriter
 Robert Estrada - HR Director
 Leah Williams - Data Analyst

Source:

Fines and lawsuits
In 2012 Loya was fined $300,000 for violating state insurance laws in Texas after insurance regulators determined the auto insurance company used false advertising, and did not follow the company's filed criteria for policy discounts to customers.

A proposed class-action lawsuit has been filed against Fred Loya Insurance Agency, and Loya Casualty Insurance Company. In this lawsuit, Plaintiffs contend that Loya did not comply with the requirements under California law for payment of wages. If successful, a class action allows former and current employees to receive back wages that are owed to them.

References

External links

 Fred Loya Insurance

American companies established in 1974
Financial services companies established in 1974
Insurance companies of the United States
Companies based in El Paso, Texas